Le Fils du Père Duchêne ("The Son of Old Man Duchesne") is the title of a newspaper which appeared in France during revolutionary periods of the nineteenth century. It borrowed its title from the original Père Duchesne published by Jacques Hébert during the French Revolution.  After Hébert's death, the title reappeared with all sorts of variations (Old Lady Duchesne, Son of Père Duchêne, etc.) from the 1790s on, notably during the Revolution of 1848 and the Paris Commune of 1871 (in editions by publishers Eugène Vermersch, Maxime Vuillaume, and Alphonse Humbert).

Ten issues appeared as an under the title The Son of Père Duchêne, from April 21 through to May 24, 1871 (descriptions below). The collection was able to illustrate the most striking events of the Commune; its last issue appeared during the Commune's end on the "Bloody Week" (Semaine sanglante) - strikingly, even the very end of the Paris government is depicted in the magazine's last issue. 

Pere Duchesne
Pere Duchesne
Pere Duchesne
French Second Republic

fr:Le père Duchêne (XIXe siècle)